The Best of Epik High - Show Must Go On & On (stylized as THE BEST OF EPIK HIGH ~SHOW MUST GO ON & ON~) is the second Japanese studio album by South Korean hip hop group Epik High. The album was released on June 8, 2016, and is a compilation of Epik High's title tracks starting from their debut album to their 2014 album, Shoebox (which had its Japanese release December 24, 2014), and contains Japanese versions of two of their past Korean title tracks, Love Love Love and Don't Hate Me. It was released by CD, DVD, and Smapra Music.

Release
Following the Japanese release of their previous album, Shoebox, the band released a compilation album of their Korean title tracks titled THE BEST OF EPIK HIGH ~SHOW MUST GO ON~ in Japan on April 29, 2015. The compilation album was released to promote their Japanese tour of the same name. The tour started on May 3, 2015 in Kanagawa and ended on May 24, 2015 in Tokyo. The group then decided to repackage the album with Japanese versions of their songs, Love Love Love (which features Sandara Park of 2NE1) and Don't Hate Me. To further promote the album, the music video of the Japanese version of Don't Hate Me was released on April 26, 2016; two months before the album.

Track listing

References

2016 albums
Epik High albums
Alternative hip hop albums